Aq Bolagh-e Olya (also Romanized as Āq Bolāgh-e ‘Olyā; also known as Āghbolāgh-e Bālā and Āgh Bolāgh-e ‘Olyā) is a village in Sokmanabad Rural District, Safayyeh District, Khoy County, West Azerbaijan Province, Iran. At the 2006 census, its population was 600, in 104 families.

References 

Populated places in Khoy County